Epic Systems Corporation, or Epic, is an American privately held healthcare software company. According to the company, hospitals that use its software held medical records of 78% of patients in the United States and over 3% of patients worldwide in 2022.

History

Epic was founded in 1979 by Judith R. Faulkner with a $70,000 investment. Originally headquartered in Madison, Wisconsin, Epic moved its headquarters to a large campus in the suburb of Verona, Wisconsin in 2005, where it employs 10,000 people as of 2019. The campus has themed areas/buildings, such as a castle-like structure, a "Wizard Campus" that appears to be inspired by J.K. Rowling's Harry Potter, and a dining facility designed to mimic a train station.

As of 2015, the company was in the fifth phase of campus expansion with five new buildings each planned to be around 100,000 square feet.

Product and market
Epic primarily develops, manufactures, licenses, supports, and sells a proprietary electronic medical record software application, known in whole as 'Epic' or an Epic EMR. The company's healthcare software is centered on its Chronicles database management system. Epic's applications support functions related to patient care, including registration and scheduling; clinical systems for doctors, nurses, emergency personnel, and other care providers; systems for lab technologists, pharmacists, and radiologists; and billing systems for insurers.  MyChart is used in the USA and other countries to access doctors’ records and for billing purposes. It is used by 150 million patients across the US.

Epic also offers cloud hosting for customers that do not wish to maintain their own servers; and short-term optimization and implementation consultants through their wholly-owned subsidiary Boost, Inc..

The company's competitors include Cerner, MEDITECH, Allscripts, athenahealth, and units of IBM, McKesson, and Siemens.

The majority of U.S. News & World Report's top-ranked hospitals and medical schools use Epic. In 2003, Kaiser Permanente began using Epic for its electronic records system. Among many others, Epic provides electronic record systems for Cedars-Sinai Medical Center in Los Angeles, the Cleveland Clinic, Johns Hopkins Hospital, UC Davis Medical Center in Sacramento, and all Mayo Clinic campuses. Partners HealthCare began adopting Epic in 2015 in a project initially reported to cost $1.2 billion, which critics decried and which is greater than the cost of its buildings. By 2018, the total expenses for the project were $1.6 billion, with payments for the software itself amounting to less than $100 million and the majority of the costs caused by lost patient revenues, tech support and other implementation work.

In 2022 Emory Healthcare, Baptist Health and Memorial Hermann Health System all switched to Epic from Cerner. Epic seems to be preferred in  large systems.

Criticisms and controversies

Data sharing
Care Everywhere is Epic's health information exchange software, which comes with its electronic health record (EHR, or EMR) system. A 2014 article in The New York Times interviews two doctors who said that their Epic systems wouldn't allow them to share data with users of competitors' software in a way that will satisfy the Meaningful Use requirements of the HITECH Act. At first, Epic charged a fee to send data to some non-Epic systems. Epic said the yearly cost for an average-sized hospital was around $5,000 a year. However, after Congressional hearings, Epic and other major software vendors announced that they would suspend per-transaction sharing fees. Epic customers must still pay for one-time costs of linking Epic to each individual non-Epic system with which they wish to exchange data; in contrast, Epic's competitors have formed the CommonWell Health Alliance which set a common Interoperability Software standard for electronic health records. A 2014 report by the RAND Corporation noted the software was difficult and costly to use in conjunction with other billing systems. The report also cited other research showing that Epic's implementation in the Kaiser Permanente system led to efficiency losses.

In September 2017, Epic announced Share Everywhere, which allows patients to authorize any provider who has internet access to view their record in Epic and to send progress notes back. Share Everywhere was named Healthcare Dive's "Health IT Development of the Year" in 2017.

UK experience 
An Epic electronic health record system costing £200 million was installed at Cambridge University Hospitals NHS Foundation Trust in October 2014, the first installation of an Epic system in the UK.

After 2.1 million records were transferred to it, it developed serious problems and the system became unstable. Ambulances were diverted to other hospitals for five hours and hospital consultants noted issues with blood transfusion and pathology services. Other problems included delays to emergency care and appointments, and problems with discharge letters, clinical letters and pathology test results. Chief information officer, Afzal Chaudhry, said "well over 90% of implementation proceeded successfully".

In July 2015, the BBC reported that the hospital's finances were being investigated. In September 2015, both the CEO and CFO of the hospital resigned. Problems with the clinical-records system, which were said to have compromised the "ability to report, highlight and take action on data" and to prescribe medication properly, were held to be contributory factors in the organization's sudden failure. In February 2016, digitalhealth.net reported that Clare Marx, president of the Royal College of Surgeons of England and member of the NHS National Information Board, found that at the time of implementation, "staff, patients and management rapidly and catastrophically lost confidence in the system. That took months and a huge amount of effort to rebuild."

Danish experience 
In 2016, Danish health authorities spent 2.8 billion DKK on the implementation of Epic in 18 hospitals in a region with 2.8 million residents. On May 20, Epic went live in the first hospital. Doctors and nurses reported chaos in the hospital and complained of a lack of preparation and training.

Since some elements of the Epic system were not properly translated from English to Danish, physicians resorted to Google Translate. As one example, when inputting information about a patient's condition, physicians were given the option to report between the left and the "correct" leg, not the left and right legs.  As of 2019, Epic had still not been fully integrated with Denmark's national medical record system. Danish anesthesiologist and computer architect Gert Galster worked to adapt the system. According to Galster, these Epic systems were designed specifically to fit the U.S. health care system, and could not be disentangled for use in Denmark.

An audit of the implementation that voiced concerns was published in June 2018. At the end of 2018, 62% of physicians expressed they were not satisfied with the system and 71 physicians signed a petition calling for its removal.

Finnish experience 
In 2012, the Hospital District of Helsinki and Uusimaa (HUS) decided to replace several smaller health record systems with one district-wide system created by Epic. It was called Apotti and would be used by healthcare and social services for the 2.2 million residents in the HUS area. The Apotti system was selected as the provider in 2015 and implementation started in 2018. By November 2022, the Apotti system had cost 625 million euros.

After the implementation, complaints from healthcare workers, especially from doctors, started accumulating. The system was accused of being too complicated and that its convoluted UI was endangering patient safety. For example, one patient was administered the wrong chemotherapeutic drug due to an unclear selection menu in the system.

In July 2022, a formal complaint demanding that the issues in the system be fixed or the system be removed entirely was sent to the Finnish health care supervising body Valvira. The complaint was signed by 619 doctors that use Apotti.

COVID-19 response 
In 2020, the novel coronavirus pandemic spread in the United States. Epic Systems faced considerable criticism for their initial plan to have their 10,000 employees return to work on-campus. Employees expressed concern about returning to the office, with the first group being required to return as early as August 10 while the pandemic continued to spread. This plan was abandoned, and as of December 2020, employees were still able to work from home. The plan had come about despite a Dane County public health order requiring remote work "to the greatest extent possible." Criticism revolved in particular around the fact that employees were being ordered back to preserve the company "culture," despite CEO Judy Faulkner's admission that work was getting done remotely. According to The Capital Times, who interviewed 26 Epic employees about the plan, "13 [employees] said they have knowledge of managers being demoted for expressing concern about the company’s plans to bring its nearly 10,000 workers back" to on-campus work, and all requested anonymity for fear of employer retribution.

In a survey of over 400 Epic employees, 89% of respondents expressed dissatisfaction with how Epic was handling the pandemic.

See also 

 Epic Systems Corp. v. Lewis

References

External links
 
 Epic, state's largest solar producer, to build own wind farm - Milwaukee Journal Sentinel article
 Epic Systems feeling heat over interoperability - Modern healthcare article
 Epic Systems, Leading Defense EHR Bidder, Slammed for Lack of Interoperability  - Nextgov article
 Patient records giant Epic Systems will take a big step into the cloud in 2015 - VentureBeat article
 Cancer moonshot head recounts exchange with Epic’s Faulkner - Politico article

Software companies based in Wisconsin
Health care companies based in Wisconsin
Electronic health record software companies
Privately held companies based in Wisconsin
Software companies established in 1979
1979 establishments in Wisconsin
Dane County, Wisconsin
Software companies of the United States